The Huolu railway station is a railway station on the Shijiazhuang–Taiyuan high-speed railway, in Huolu, Luquan District, Shijiazhuang, Hebei, People's Republic of China.

Railway stations in Hebei
Stations on the Qingdao–Taiyuan High-Speed Railway